The 2019 Coupe de France Final was a football match between Rennes and Paris Saint-Germain to decide the winner of the 2018–19 Coupe de France, the 102nd season of the Coupe de France. Rennes won the cup, their first since 1971, after a penalty shoot-out following a 2–2 draw in extra time.

Route to the final

Note: H = home fixture, A = away fixture

Match

Details

References

Coupe De France Final 2019
Coupe De France Final 2019
2019
Coupe De France Final
Final
Coupe de France Final 2019
Coupe De France Final 2019
Coupe De France Final